Mian Quan (literally "Cotton Fist") is a northern Chinese martial arts style which most likely originated in the province of Hebei. There is no definite given record of the creator or origin of the style. 

The theory for this style is that defense becomes offense and softness turns to hardness, and the practitioner's attacks always follow after the opponent's. Soft attacks gain the upper hand for a practitioner and sets up the opponent for a harder, more dominant array of movements. It was one of the wushu styles demonstrated at the 1936 Summer Olympics in Berlin, Germany. Lan Suzhen performed a modified version of the art at the 1953 Tianjin Sports festival and it was generally well received.

The style is simple to use as it does not require advanced movements such as grappling, therefore only using punches and kicks. Mian Quan requires balanced posture, with the majority of the body relaxed and a short-range attack span.

Some lineage below, I could go more however our current system is not called Mian Quan hence I only offer 2 names. 
Mong Gwa Yu - creator of Mian Quan. 
Son Fu Ai (1888-1956) - last student of Mong Gwa Yu

Trivia
Mileena of the Mortal Kombat series uses Mian Quan as a secondary fighting style in Mortal Kombat: Deception and a primary in Mortal Kombat: Armageddon.

References

External links
 Mian Quan information

Chinese martial arts